Hadol may refer to :

 Hadol, Vosges, a commune in the Grand Est region, France
 Hadol State, a village and former princely state in Mahi Kantha, Gujarat, India
 Paul Hadol (1835–1875), French illustrator and caricaturist